Dattaji Nalawade was an Indian politician and leader of Shiv Sena. He was mayor of Mumbai and speaker of Maharashtra Legislative Assembly in India. 
He represented the Worli Vidhan Sabha constituency from 1990 to 2009. He was the Mayor of Mumbai in 1986.

Death
Dattaji Nalawade died in Jaslok Hospital, Mumbai on 15 Feb 2013 aged 77 after critical lung infections.

Positions held
 1986: Mayor of Mumbai 
 1990: Elected to Maharashtra Legislative Assembly (1st term)
 1995: Elected to Maharashtra Legislative Assembly (2nd term)
 1995-99: Speaker of the Maharashtra Legislative Assembly
 1999: Elected to Maharashtra Legislative Assembly (3rd term)
 2004: Elected to Maharashtra Legislative Assembly (4th term)

References

External links
 Shivsena Home Page
 नलावडे यांचे निधन/ Dattaji Nalawade esakal article

Maharashtra MLAs 1990–1995
Marathi politicians
2013 deaths
Speakers of the Maharashtra Legislative Assembly
Mayors of Mumbai
Shiv Sena politicians
1935 births
Maharashtra MLAs 1995–1999
Maharashtra MLAs 1999–2004
Maharashtra MLAs 2004–2009